Eulogio "Amang" Adona Rodriguez Sr. (born Eulogio Rodríguez y Adona; January 21, 1883 – December 19, 1964) was a Filipino politician who twice served as President of the Senate of the Philippines.

Early life

Coming from a poor family, Rodriguez was born in Montalban (renamed Rodriguez in his honor), then part of Manila province on January 21, 1883 to Petronilo Rodriguez and Monica Adona. He first studied at the Spanish-run public school in Montalban, then took his secondary course at the Colegio de San Juan de Letran in Manila, where he completed his Bachelor of Arts in 1896. He then studied law under a private tutor. To help himself in his studies, he worked as a farmer.

Political career

Rodriguez first served as Municipal President of Montalban, Rizal from 1906–1916; became Governor of Rizal in June 1916; and was reelected in June 1922. He was appointed mayor of Manila by Governor General Leonard Wood on July 23, 1923, and later served as Representative of Nueva Vizcaya from February 1924 to May 1925. He became the Representative of the Second District of Rizal in 1925 and was reelected in 1931 and 1934. 

He was also appointed Secretary of Agriculture and Commerce by Governor Frank Murphy on July 26, 1934, re-appointed by President Manuel L. Quezon on November 15, 1935, and served as such until 1938. After his resignation as Mayor of Manila, he campaigned for a seat in the Senate and was elected senator in 1941. 

On May 20, 1953, he was elected Senate President, a position he occupied for the next ten years. As the third highest government official, he steered the Senate into greater heights in terms of legislation. He was replaced by then-Senator Ferdinand Marcos, then the Minority Floor Leader as Senate President in a leadership coup on 1963, ending his long leadership of the Upper Chamber.

Rodriguez started his political career as a Democrata or a member of the opposition party, and not until there was a general realignment of parties due to the divisive struggle over the approval of the Independence Law in 1933, did he switch to the majority or the Nacionalista Party, to which he remained faithful until the day of his death three decades later. He nursed the party during its darkest hours, and steered it successfully through the political reefs and typhoons that rocked the local scene, thus earning him the nickname "Mr. Nacionalista". Unlike many politicians of his time, he did not switch parties for personal convenience.

Personal life

He had seven children by his first wife, Juana Santiago: Eulogio Jr., Jose, Ruperto, Leonor, Isidro, Constancio and Adelaida. With his second wife, Luisita Canoy, he had three children: Adelaida Erlinda and Rafael.

Death
He died on December 19, 1964 in Pasay, Philippines, at the age of 81.

Legacy

After Amang's death, Amang Rodriguez Memorial Medical Center, a private hospital in Marikina, was named after him.

Eulogio "Amang" Rodriguez Institute of Science and Technology was established in 1945 was named after him.

España Boulevard Extension in Manila and an avenue between Rosario and Dela Paz in Pasig were renamed in his honor, as well as the municipality of Montalban.

See also
 List of Philippine legislators who died in office

References
Senate of the Philippines
Paras, Corazon. The presidents of the Senate of the Republic of the Philippines. Quezon City: Giraffe Books, 2000. 

1883 births
1964 deaths
Colegio de San Juan de Letran alumni
Filipino collaborators with Imperial Japan
People from Rodriguez, Rizal
Presidents of the Senate of the Philippines
Mayors of Manila
Mayors of places in Rizal
Governors of Rizal
Senators of the 5th Congress of the Philippines
Senators of the 4th Congress of the Philippines
Senators of the 3rd Congress of the Philippines
Senators of the 2nd Congress of the Philippines
Senators of the 1st Congress of the Philippines
Senators of the 1st Congress of the Commonwealth of the Philippines
Nacionalista Party politicians
Secretaries of Agriculture of the Philippines
Secretaries of Trade and Industry of the Philippines
Members of the House of Representatives of the Philippines from Rizal
Members of the House of Representatives of the Philippines from Nueva Vizcaya
People from Nueva Vizcaya
Quezon administration cabinet members
Candidates in the 1946 Philippine vice-presidential election
Presidents of the Nacionalista Party
Members of the Philippine Legislature
Tagalog people